Gypsies (Czech: Cikáni) is a 1922 Czech silent drama film directed by Karl Anton and starring Hugo Svoboda, Olga Augustová and Theodor Pistek.

It is an adaptation of the 1835 novel Cikáni by Karel Hynek Mácha. Along with Anton's later silent The May Fairy, it is credited with initiating the tradition of lyricism in Czech cinema.

Plot summary

Cast
 Hugo Svoboda as Giacomo  
 Olga Augustová as Angelina  
 Theodor Pistek as Count Valdemar Lomecký  
 Alfons Rasp as son of Valdemar Lomecký  
 Julius Czonský as innkeeper  
 Bronislava Livia as Lea  
 Karel Fiala as Administrator of a manor  
 Karel Schleichert as Old Veteran  
 Josef Sváb-Malostranský as guest  
 Karel Faltys as Napoleon  
 Jirina Janderová as Countess Lomecká  
 Jindrich Edl as presiding judge  
 Frantisek Kudlácek as priest

References

External links
 
 

Czech silent films
Czech drama films
1922 drama films
Films directed by Karl Anton
Czech black-and-white films
Silent drama films
1920s Czech-language films